The San Diego State Aztecs women's lacrosse team is an NCAA Division I college lacrosse team representing San Diego State University as an independent. They team began play in 2012 and has been coached by Kylee White since its inception. The team plays its home games at the on-campus Aztec Lacrosse Field in San Diego, California.

All-time season results

References

External links
 

San Diego State Aztecs
College women's lacrosse teams in the United States
Women's sports in California